Nkosana is an African given name. Notable people with the name include:

Nkosana Makate (born 1977), South African businessman
Nkosana Mpofu (born 1990), Zimbabwean first-class cricketer
Nkosana Mhlanga (born 1998), South African-born famous sneaker designer

African given names